Siamand Rahman (21 March 1988 – 1 March 2020) was an Iranian Paralympic powerlifter. He won gold medals at the 2012 Summer Paralympics in London, 2016 Summer Paralympics in Rio and the 2010 Asian Para Games in Guangzhou. Siamand died on 1 March 2020 due to cardiac arrest.

Powerlifting career
Despite Rahman suffering disability affecting both legs due to polio, he has been described as "the world's strongest Paralympian".

Rahman began his career in Oshnavieh, Iran, supported by his family and coach Ali Asghar in 2008. He appeared on world stage for the first time at the 2010 IPC Powerlifting World Championships in Kuala Lumpur, Malaysia, where he competed in men's +100 kg category and bench pressed  to win the silver medal, losing only to teammate Karem Rajabi Golojeh. He set a new IPC Powerlifting World Record in the +100 kg category on his fourth lift with a  bench press, but unfortunately it did not count toward his medal performance.

He broke his own world record once more, lifting  at a competition in Sharjah, United Arab Emirates on December 4, 2011.

Although he failed lifting  on his third attempt due to uneven lockout, Rahman claimed he has hit that mark in training many times and hoped to continue breaking his own records during the next Paralympic cycle. With his successful lift of  Rahman was 38 kg beyond Faris Al-Ajeeli, who claimed the silver medal by lifting .

Rahman is the first Paralympic lifter who has bench pressed .

Following the 2016 Paralympics, Rahman was named Best Male at the Paralympic Sport Awards.

Personal records

Powerlifting competition records:

done in official powerlifting meets
 Raw Bench press – 291.0 kg (641.5 lb) (+100 kg category) raw without wrist wraps or a belt (2011-12-04)

Powerlifting gym records (unofficial):

done in the gym (based on video footage)
 Raw Bench press –

Major results

See also
 Paralympic powerlifting world records
 Progression of the bench press world record
 Eric Spoto
 Big James Henderson
 Scot Mendelson

References

External links

 Video: Siamand Rahman at the Paralympics 2012 - all lifts - 270kg - 280kg - 301kg
 Video: RAHMAN Siamand Islamic Republic of Iran Paralympic benchpress 301 kg HD (at the Paralympics 2012 in London)
 Video: Paralympic Powerlifting Benchpress Men +100kg WR 290kg by Siamand Rahman (Guangzhou 2010 Asian Games)
 Video: Siamand Rahman - 672 lb / 305 kg Raw Bench Press (unofficial gym lift)

Paralympic powerlifters of Iran
1988 births
2020 deaths
Powerlifters at the 2012 Summer Paralympics
Medalists at the 2012 Summer Paralympics
Powerlifters at the 2016 Summer Paralympics
Medalists at the 2016 Summer Paralympics
Paralympic gold medalists for Iran
Iranian Kurdish people
Paralympic Sport Awards — Best Male winners
Paralympic medalists in powerlifting
21st-century Iranian people